Maurice Donald Williamson (born 6 March 1951) is a New Zealand politician and diplomat who represented Pakuranga in the House of Representatives as a member of the National Party. He held several ministerial portfolios both inside and outside the cabinet: Transport, Communications, Broadcasting, Local Government, Research Science and Technology, Building and Construction, Customs, Small Business, Statistics and Land Information. He later entered local politics, and since October 2022 has been an Auckland councillor for Howick.

Member of Parliament

Williamson was a member of Parliament for the National Party, a centre-right political Party in New Zealand, as MP for Pakuranga since the 1987 general election. He held a number of ministerial posts, including Minister of Communications, Minister of Broadcasting, Minister of Transport, and Minister of Research, Science and Technology, and associate Minister of Health (1990–96). He was a strong supporter of reform of prostitution law.

His 2005 election campaign saw one of the strongest results for National across New Zealand.

Suspensions 
He was suspended from caucus on 22 July 2003, after refusing to curtail his criticism of the National Party leader, Bill English, who he blamed for poor performance in the polls. After English was replaced by Don Brash, Williamson was reinstated. After his return from suspension, Williamson played an active role in National, and was elevated up the ranks to eighth position in the National lineup in 2008.

On 1 May 2014, he resigned his ministerial portfolios after making what the Prime Minister, John Key, called, "A serious error of judgement." The Prime Minister was referring to a phone call Mr Williamson had made to the police enquiring about a charge they were laying against businessman and National Party donor Donghua Liu over domestic violence allegations. Williamson had told police he was not trying to interfere with the process – he just wanted to make sure somebody had reviewed the matter to ensure the police were on solid ground as "Mr Liu is investing a lot of money in New Zealand".

Candid remarks 
Williamson became known for his candid remarks and humor which often attracted controversy. In 2011, he attracted controversy for making crude jokes during a speech addressing a conference audience. Speaking to a Samoan speaker, he joked whether his "papers were in order". Later he said: "What is the difference between Muslims and Kiwis? Muslims get to commit adultery and get stoned, Kiwis get stoned and commit adultery". In 2015, Prime Minister John Key defended him as a "flamboyant" person with a "strong sense of humour" after Williamson was accused of making "sexist" remarks during another speech. He later apologised. Earlier in 2007, Williamson was slammed for an email he sent in response to a TV report on obesity: "If some people can't lose weight no matter what ... how come there were no fat people in the Nazi concentration camps?"

49th and 50th New Zealand Parliaments 
After the 2008 general election the National Party formed a minority government with three confidence and supply partners. Despite his high list placing, Williamson was not selected for cabinet due in part to a series of gaffes during the election campaign relating to the party's policy on road tolls. He was given ministerial responsibilities outside of cabinet for Customs, Building and Construction, Statistics and Small Business. One of the major matters under his governance was the ongoing leaky homes crisis, which he noted as having the government "stumped" due to its enormity.

In June 2009, Richard Worth left Parliament after Prime Minister John Key lost confidence in him as a minister over sexual allegations. Williamson was made the acting minister of Worth's portfolios of Internal Affairs, National Library and Archives New Zealand which were subsequently passed on to Nathan Guy.

After the election of the 50th Parliament of New Zealand Williamson was returned to his seat and re-appointed as a minister in the second term of the National-led government. Williamson retained his 2008 portfolios of Customs, Land Information and Building and Construction but lost the role of Minister for Small Business to John Banks as part of the new National-ACT Confidence and Supply deal. Williamson remained a minister outside of cabinet, along with Jo Goodhew, Chester Borrows and Chris Tremain, until his resignation from all ministerial portfolios on 1 May 2014.

He announced that he would not stand for Parliament at the 2017 election.

Transport advocacy 
In 2003, Williamson suggested that "cities have squandered fortunes upgrading their public transport only to find the car remains the mode of choice for most" and said local government subsidies should be axed for roading maintenance and public transport.

As a one-time Transport Minister and a local MP, Williamson has long supported and advocated for more motorway and roading projects. In 2005, he advocated for the Eastern Transport Corridor motorway to expand Auckland's motorway network, saying that the city was "grossly short" of motorways. As the National Party's transport spokesperson in the 2008 general election, he prompted controversy for supporting significant road tolls to enable new motorway construction projects. 

In 2015, he advocated for two local roads in his Pakuranga electorate to be redesignated as state highways, as he felt Auckland Transport was prioritising public transport infrastructure too heavily in planning.

'Big gay rainbow' speech 
In April 2013, Williamson voted in favour of the Marriage (Definition of Marriage) Amendment Bill which legalised same-sex marriage, delivering a memorable speech prior to the third reading vote.

The speech was soon being referenced worldwide by news outlets and was chosen as 2013's quote of the year by Massey University. With Williamson's sarcastic and honest approach, the speech was viewed hundreds of thousands of times over the next few days, and featured on high-profile news sites like The Huffington Post and Gawker. Williamson said he had an offer to go on The Ellen DeGeneres Show, but had to turn it down due to rules around ministers accepting gifts. Williamson was later given approval by the prime minister to go on the show as long as he donated any money received to charity. Williamson's speech was praised by Opposition politicians and left-wing media commentators.

Later career and return to politics

After he announced his intention to leave parliament at the 2017 election, Williamson was appointed the New Zealand consul-general in Los Angeles in 2016. He took up the post the following year.

Williamson returned to the New Zealand political scene in 2022 by running for Auckland Council as one of the two councillors for the Howick Ward, which encompasses all of Williamson's former Pakuranga parliamentary electorate. Williamson ran on a ticket with sitting councillor Sharon Stewart, and in October 2022 Williamson and Stewart were both elected, defeating sitting Howick councillor Paul Young.

References

External links 
Profile at National party

Voting record at CommoNZ (conscience votes)
Maurice Williamson at Times Online
Executive Government 1993-6: Maurice Williamson
Executive Government 1996-9: Maurice Williamson

1951 births
Living people
Members of the Cabinet of New Zealand
Government ministers of New Zealand
New Zealand National Party MPs
University of Auckland alumni
Members of the New Zealand House of Representatives
New Zealand MPs for Auckland electorates
People from Matamata
21st-century New Zealand politicians